The 2019 Colorado Buffaloes football team represented the University of Colorado in the Pac-12 Conference during the 2019 NCAA Division I FBS football season. Led by first-year head coach Mel Tucker, the Buffaloes played their home games on campus at Folsom Field in Boulder and finished at 5–7 (3–6 in Pac-12, fifth in the South Division).

Previously the defensive coordinator at Georgia, Tucker left after just one season at CU for Michigan State of the Big Ten Conference.

Preseason

Pac-12 media days

Pac-12 media poll
In the 2019 Pac-12 preseason media poll, Colorado was voted to finish in last place in the South Division.

Coaching staff

Schedule
Colorado's 2019 schedule began on Friday, August 30 with a non-conference neutral site game against in-state rival Colorado State in Denver. The Buffaloes will then play two more non-conference games at home, first against traditional Big Eight Conference rival Nebraska, now a member of the Big Ten Conference, and then against in-state foe Air Force, a member of the Mountain West Conference along with Colorado State. In Pac-12 Conference play, Colorado will play the other members of the South Division and draws Oregon, Stanford, Washington, and Washington State from the North Division. They will not play California or Oregon State as part of the regular season.

Game summaries

vs. Colorado State

Nebraska

Air Force

at Arizona State

Arizona

at Oregon

at Washington State

USC

at UCLA

Stanford

Washington

at Utah

Players drafted into the NFL

References

Colorado
Colorado Buffaloes football seasons
Colorado Buffaloes football